Jus tertii (English: third party rights) is the legal classification for an argument made by a third party (as opposed  to the legal title holder) which attempts to justify entitlement to possessory rights based on the showing of legal title in another person. By showing legitimate title in another person, jus tertii arguments imply that the present possessor’s interest is illegitimate or that the present possessor is a thief.

Under United States law, jus tertii arguments are generally insufficient to support actions for replevin because they fail to show that possession is more legitimate in the third party than in the present possessor. However, a bailee or other legal agent of the owner may successfully assert the argument.

The principle is sometimes used to allow one person to enforce or test the constitutional rights of another, which usually can't be done due to lack of standing.  This is only possible for fundamental rights, where there is a close connection between the person whose rights are violated and the person wishing to enforce them, and the constitutional right being enforced is a fundamental right.  See, e.g., Singleton v. Wulff Et Al., 96 S. Ct. 2868, 428 U.S. 106 (U.S. 1976).

Hypothetical example
Art brings an action for replevin against Burt, seeking to recover a bicycle. In support for the action, Art presents evidence that Cathy is in fact the true owner of the bicycle in question, not Burt. A US court would reject Art’s jus tertii argument for replevin because he has failed to show that he has a more legitimate interest in the bike than Burt.

Case law example
In Gissel v. State, 727 P.2d 1153 (Idaho 1986), Gissel unlawfully harvested wild rice growing on land jointly owned by the state of Idaho and the National Forest Service. An Idaho Court convicted Gissel of trespass, and Idaho officials seized and sold the rice at auction. Because Idaho had only one half interest in the land, Gissel challenged the state’s authority to seize, sell, and keep the profits from all of the rice. The Idaho Supreme Court held that Gissel was entitled to half of the profits because Idaho did not effectively make the jus tertii argument on behalf of the federal government, “the Gissels, though trespassers and without legal title, which title rests with the Forest Service, still by mere possession have greater rights superior to that of the state.”

The jus tertii principle also extends to criminal law. For example, in Anic, Stylianou & Suleyman v R, three men were charged with larceny (among other things) after breaking into a house to steal drugs. The men argued that they should not be charged with stealing something which is unlawfully possessed. The court rejected this argument on the basis that larceny has always been an offence against possession. The common law has never recognised an absolute right of ownership. The owner is merely the person who has the best right to possession. Therefore, a person can be guilty of larceny by stealing from someone who had stolen the thing from someone else. The right to possess drugs is limited by statute but the occupant of the house had a better right to possession than the defendants.

References

External links

 Professor Roger Bernhardt's Property Law Textbook

Property law